In the U.S. state of Alabama, U.S. Route 45 (US 45) is a  north–south United States Highway in the east south central state of Alabama. It travels from Mobile to the Mississippi state line, just east of State Line, Mississippi. The highway's southern terminus is in Mobile, at an intersection with US 98. Its northern terminus in the state of Alabama is at the Mississippi state line.

In Alabama, all of the U.S. Highways have one or more unsigned state highways designated along its length. US 45 travels concurrently with State Route 17 (SR 17) from its southern terminus to just north of Deer Park. For the rest of its length in the state, the highway travels concurrently with State Route 57 (SR 57).

Route description

Mobile County
US 45, along with unsigned SR 17, begins at an intersection with US 98 (Spring Hill Avenue; unsigned SR 42) in the central part of Mobile, in Mobile County. US 45 heads to the northwest and travels just north of Lyons Park and skirts along the northeastern edge of USA Children's & Women's Hospital. It crosses over Threemile Creek and curves to the north-northwest. It passes just to the east of Washington Middle School and Carver Park. Just after passing Gorgas Park and LeFlore Magnet High School, the highway curves back to the northwest. At an intersection with West Prichard Avenue, it leaves Mobile and enters Prichard. It crosses over some railroad tracks of Canadian National Railway just before an interchange with Interstate 65 (I-65) at exit 8. The highway passes Whispering Pines Cemetery just before crossing over Eightmile Creek. Almost immediately, it intersects the southern terminus of SR 213 (South Shelton Beach Road). Approximately  later is an intersection with the southern terminus of SR 217 (Lott Road). US 45 passes John F. Fagerstrom Municipal Park and then Collins–Rhodes Elementary School. It curves to the north-northeast and crosses over Seabury Creek. The highway curves to a nearly due north direction and has an interchange with SR 158 (Industrial Parkway). It curves back to the northwest and travels through Kushla, which is within the city limits of Prichard. Immediately after leaving the city, the highway crosses over Magee Creek. It then enters Mauvilla. Here, it intersects the southern terminus of County Route 78 (CR 78; Spice Pond Road). Just northeast of Mauvilla Cemetery is an intersection with the southern terminus of CR 55 (Kali Oka Road). US 45 curves to the north-northwest, leaves Mauvilla, and crosses over Williams Creek. It curves to the north and crosses over Silver Creek. It curves to the north-northeast and enters Chunchula. The highway curves back to the north-northwest and enters the main part of the community. There, the highway has an intersection with CR 63 (Chunchula–Georgetown Road/Roberts Road). It curves back to the northwest and crosses over Beaver Pond Creek. It curves back to the north-northwest and crosses over Sweetwater and Drinking branches. It heads to the north-northeast and crosses over Sand Hill Creek. In Gulfcrest, the highway intersects the eastern terminus of CR 92 (Gulfcrest Road). The highway curves to the north and passes McDavid–Jones Elementary School. Then, it enters Citronelle. Almost immediately is an intersection with CR 41 (Celeste Road), which begins to parallel the U.S. Highway. It passes Lott Middle School and then Pilgrims Rest Cemetery. At an intersection with the southern terminus of Main Street, CR 41 ends its paralleling of US 45. It curves to the north and crosses over Puppy Creek. In the main part of Citronelle, it has an intersection with both CR 96 (West State Street) and the northern terminus of CR 41 (East State Street). CR 96 has a brief unsigned concurrency with US 45. On the northeastern edge of the intersection is War Memorial Park. One block later, CR 96 splits off to the east, onto Lebaron Avenue. On the northeastern edge of the intersection, US 45 passes the new campus of Citronelle High School. It curves to the north-northwest and briefly leaves Citronelle. It passes Wesleyan Christian Academy and then re-enters the city for a very short stint. During the last stint, it crosses over Bennett Creek. Upon leaving the city, it enters Washington County.

Washington County
US 45 continues to the northwest, through rural areas of the state. It crosses over Long and Flat branches just before intersecting the eastern terminus of CR 8 (Deer Park–Burbank Road), just to the east of Deer Park. Almost immediately, the highway crosses over Yellowhouse Branch. Then, it curves to the north. After passing Deer Park Cemetery, US 45 and SR 17's concurrency ends as SR 17 splits off at a Y interchange. At this intersection SR 57 has its southern terminus, and begins traveling concurrently with US 45, while SR 17 heads towards the cities of Chatom and Butler. The highway curves back to the northwest and crosses over Pine Branch on the Donald R. Stallworth Sr. Bridge before intersecting the southern terminus of CR 1 (Main Street). This intersection is just to the east of Vinegar Bend. Farther to the northwest, in an area known as Four Points, is an intersection with CR 20 (Four Points Road). The highway then crosses over the Escatawpa River. A short distance later, it enters Fruitdale. There, US 45 intersects CR 1 again. The highway curves to the north-northwest and leaves Fruitdale. It then begins paralleling Brushy Creek. The highway travels through Yellow Pine, just north-northwest of which is the end of the paralleling of the creek. It continues to the north-northwest and reaches the Mississippi state line. Here, SR 57 ends, and US 45 continues its path into that state.

National Highway System
All of US 45 in the state of Alabama is part of the National Highway System (NHS), a system of highways determined to be the most important for the nation's economy, mobility, and defense.

History

1910s and 1920s
The road that would become US 45 in Alabama was designated at least as early as 1914. This road traveled in Mobile and Prichard as an "improved hard surface road" (macadam, gravel, chert) and from Prichard to Citronelle as an "improved soil road". There was also a segment from about Deer Park to Yellow Pine as an "unimproved road". By 1925, the roadway was entirely built in the state. It was designated as SR 28, and it is an "existing road upon which state has done no work". That year, US 45 was designated along its entire length in the state. The entire highway was an "existing road upon which the state has done no work" except for a segment from just north of Gulfcrest to Fruitdale, which was indicated to be graded. By 1928, the segment from Mobile to just north of Gulfcrest was indicated to be "unimproved", while the segment from Fruitdale to the Mississippi state line was indicated to be graded, in addition to the Gulfcrest-to-Fruitdale segment. Also, SR 57 was designated along the entire length of the highway.

1930s
By 1930, the highway was indicated to have a "hard surface" in Mobile and Citronelle; a gravel/chert or a sand-clay/topsoil surface from Mobile to Citronelle; and "graded" from Citronelle to the Mississippi state line. Later that year, the entire Mobile County segment was indicated to have a "hard surface". The entire Washington County segment was indicated to have been graded. By the end of 1934, US 43, along with SR 5 were designated in Mobile, but the state maps are unclear as to whether they traveled concurrently with US 45/SR 57. By 1935, the entire Mobile County segment was indicated to have a "pavement" surface. The entire Washington County segment was indicated to have a "gravel or chert" surface. By 1939, the highway was indicated to be under construction from the Mobile–Washington county line to about Fruitdale.

1940s to 1980s
By 1941, the highway was indicated to be under construction from just southeast of Fruitdale to just northwest of Yellow Pine. By 1942, US 45 was indicated to be paved for its entire length in the state. By 1952, SR 57 was decommissioned south of the Deer Park area. It was replaced by SR 17, as it exists today. By 1957, SR 5, which was concurrent with US 43 in Mobile was truncated farther north. It was replaced by SR 13. However, it was still not clear whether US 43 and SR 13 were concurrent with US 45 in the city. By 1983, US 43 and SR 13 were moved off of US 45 and SR 17 in Mobile.

Major intersections

See also

References

External links

 U.S. Highway 45 (AL) on AARoads.com
 U.S. Highway 45 Northbound (AL) on AARoads.com
 U.S. Highway 45 Southbound (AL) on AARoads.com
 Alabama US System Routes on AJFroggie.com
 Historical U.S. Route Termini in Alabama on AJFroggie.com
 End of US highway 45 on USEnds.com
 An historic US highway endpoint in Mobile, AL on USEnds.com

 
45
Transportation in Mobile County, Alabama
Transportation in Washington County, Alabama
Mobile metropolitan area
Transportation in Mobile, Alabama